The women's elimination race competition at the 2020 UEC European Track Championships was held on 12 November 2020.

Results

References

Women's elimination race
European Track Championships – Women's elimination race